Tinea is a genus of the fungus moth family, Tineidae. Therein, it belongs to the subfamily Tineinae. As evident by its name, it is the type genus of its subfamily and family. Established as one of the first subgroups of "Phalaena", it used to contain many species of Tineidae that are nowadays placed in other genera, as well as a few moths nowadays placed elsewhere.

Selected species

Species of Tinea include:

 Tinea antricola Meyrick, 1924
 Tinea apicimaculella Chambers, 1875
 Tinea atmogramma Meyrick, 1927
 Tinea basifasciella Ragonot, 1895
 Tinea behrensella Chambers, 1875
 Tinea bothniella Svensson, 1953
 Tinea carnariella Clemens, 1859
 Tinea chaotica Meyrick, 1893
 Tinea columbariella Wocke, 1877
 Tinea corynephora Turner, 1927
 Tinea croceoverticella Chambers, 1876
 Tinea drymonoma Turner, 1923
 Tinea dubiella Stainton, 1859
 Tinea flavescentella Haworth, 1828
 Tinea flavofimbriella (Chrétien, 1925)
 Tinea grumella Zeller, 1873
 Tinea irrepta Braun, 1926
 Tinea lanella Pierce & Metcalfe, 1934
 Tinea mandarinella Dietz, 1905
 Tinea melanoptycha (Turner, 1939)
 Tinea messalina Robinson, 1979
 Tinea misceella Chambers, 1873
 Tinea murariella Staudinger, 1859
 Tinea niveocapitella Chambers, 1875
 Tinea occidentella Chambers, 1880
 Tinea omichlopis Meyrick, 1928 (= T. nonimella)
 Tinea pallescentella Stainton, 1851 (= T. galeatella)
 Tinea pellionella – case-bearing clothes moth
 Tinea poecilella Rebel, 1940
 Tinea porphyropa Meyrick, 1927
 Tinea porphyrota Meyrick, 1893 (tentatively placed here)
 Tinea prensoria Meyrick, 1931
 Tinea semifulvella
 Tinea sequens Meyrick, 1919
 Tinea steueri Petersen, 1966
 Tinea straminiella Chambers, 1873
 Tinea svenssoni Opheim, 1965
 Tinea thoracestrigella Chambers, 1876
 Tinea translucens Meyrick, 1917
 Tinea tridectis Meyrick, 1893
 Tinea trinotella
 Tinea unomaculella Chambers, 1875
 Tinea xanthostictella Dietz, 1905
 Tinea xenodes Meyrick, 1909

Species formerly placed here include for example Ceratobia oxymora. Before the 19th century, many unrelated moths were placed in Tinea at one time or another.

Synonyms
Junior synonyms of Tinea are:
 Acedes Hübner, [1825]
 Autoses Hübner, [1825]
 Chrysoryctis Meyrick, 1886
 Dystinea Börner in Brohmer, 1925
 Monopina Zagulyaev, 1955
 Scleroplasta Meyrick, 1919
 Ses Hübner, 1822
 Taenia (lapsus; non Linnaeus, 1758: preoccupied)
 Tinaea (lapsus)
 Tinearia Rafinesque, 1815 (unjustified emendation; non Schellenberg, 1803: preoccupied)
 Tineopis Zagulyaev, 1960

Edosa is sometimes included in Tinea; it is here treated as doubtfully distinct genus for the time being.

Footnotes

References

  (2008): Australian Faunal Directory – Tinea. Version of 2008-OCT-09. Retrieved 2010-MAY-03.
  (2009): Tinea. Version 2.1, 2009-DEC-22. Retrieved 2010-MAY-03.
  (2004): Butterflies and Moths of the World, Generic Names and their Type-species – Tinea. Version of 2004-NOV-05. Retrieved 2010-MAY-05.
  [2010]: Global Taxonomic Database of Tineidae (Lepidoptera). Retrieved 2010-MAY-05.
  (2009): Markku Savela's Lepidoptera and some other life forms – Tinea. Version of 2009-AUG-20. Retrieved 2010-MAY-03.

Tineinae
Taxa named by Carl Linnaeus
Tineidae genera